The 1962 All-SEC football team consists of American football players selected to the All-Southeastern Conference (SEC) chosen by various selectors for the 1962 NCAA University Division football season.

All-SEC selections

Ends
Tom Hutchinson, Kentucky (AP-1, UPI-1)
Johnny Baker, Miss. St. (AP-1, UPI-2)
Billy Martin, Georgia Tech (UPI-1)
Mickey Babb, Georgia (UPI-2)
Richard Williamson, Alabama (UPI-3)
Ted Davis, Georgia Tech (UPI-3)

Tackles
Fred Miller, LSU (AP-1, UPI-1)
Junior Hawthorne, Kentucky (AP-1, UPI-2)
Jim Dunaway, Ole Miss (UPI-1)
Anton Peters, Florida (UPI-2)
Don Estes, LSU (UPI-3)
Joe Baughan, Auburn (UPI-3)

Guards
Rufus Guthrie, Georgia Tech (AP-1, UPI-1)
Don Dickson, Ole Miss (AP-1, UPI-2)
Dave Watson, Georgia Tech (UPI-1)
Bill Van Dyke, Auburn (UPI-2)
Larry Travis, Florida (UPI-3)
Pat Watson, Miss. St. (UPI-3)

Centers
Lee Roy Jordan, Alabama (AP-1, UPI-1)
Dennis Gaubatz, LSU (UPI-2)
Jim Price, Auburn (UPI-3)

Quarterbacks

Billy Lothridge, Georgia Tech (AP-1, UPI-1)
Joe Namath, Alabama (UPI-2)

Halfbacks
Jerry Stovall, LSU (College Football Hall of Fame) (AP-1, UPI-1)
Glynn Griffing, Ole Miss (AP-1, UPI-1)
Larry Dupree, Florida (AP-1, UPI-1)
Cotton Clark, Alabama (UPI-2)
Larry Rakestraw, Florida (UPI-2)
Mallon Faircloth, Tennessee (UPI-2)
Mike McNames, Georgia Tech (UPI-3)
Darrell Cox, Kentucky (UPI-3)
Louis Guy, Ole Miss (UPI-3)
Jimmy Burson, Auburn (UPI-3)

Key

AP = Associated Press

UPI = United Press International

Bold = Consensus first-team selection by both AP and UPI

See also
1962 College Football All-America Team

References

All-SEC
All-SEC football teams